Diyashevo (Diyaş) is a rural locality (a selo) in Diyashevsky Selsoviet, Bakalinsky District, Bashkortostan, Russia. The population was 375 as of 2010. There are 3 streets.

Geography 
Diyashevo is located 15 km southwest of Bakaly (the district's administrative centre) by road. Mikhaylovka is the nearest rural locality.

References 

Rural localities in Bakalinsky District